Joseph Silto (1911–2007), was a male English international table tennis player.

Table tennis career
He was the captain of England during the 1935-36 season. He played in the 1935 World Table Tennis Championships and 1936 World Table Tennis Championships.

Personal life
He was born and lived in Swindon for his entire life. He was the son of English footballer Billy Silto.

See also
 List of table tennis players

References

English male table tennis players
1911 births
2007 deaths